Neosminthurus richardsi is a species of globular springtail in the family Sminthuridae.

References

Collembola
Articles created by Qbugbot
Animals described in 1978